DNA topoisomerase IIα is a human enzyme encoded by the TOP2A gene.

Topoisomerase IIα relieves topological  DNA stress during transcription, condenses chromosomes, and separates chromatids. It catalyzes the transient breaking and rejoining of two strands of duplex DNA which allows the strands to pass through one another. Two forms of this enzyme exist as likely products of a gene duplication event. The gene encoding this form, alpha, is localized to chromosome 17 and the beta gene is localized to chromosome 3. The gene encoding this enzyme functions as the target for several chemotherapy agents and a variety of mutations in this gene have been associated with the development of drug resistance. Reduced activity of this enzyme may also play a role in ataxia-telangiectasia.

Interactions 

TOP2A has been shown to interact with SMURF2, HDAC1, CDC5L, Small ubiquitin-related modifier 1, P53, and TOPBP1.

In other species
In Drosophila Hadlaczky et al 1988 found DNA topoisomerase II α to correlate with cell proliferation - but β did not.

See also 
 Topoisomerase II
 TOP2B - Topoisomerase II beta
 Gene duplication
 Ataxia-telangiectasia
 TOPBP1

References

Further reading